Carolyn M. Mazure (born 1949) is an American psychologist and the Norma Weinberg Spungen and Joan Lebson Bildner Professor of Psychiatry and Psychology at the Yale School of Medicine.  She created and directs Women’s Health Research at Yale — Yale’s interdisciplinary research center on health and gender.

Research 
Her primary research focus is the development of models for understanding depression and addictive behaviors, particularly as they relate to smoking. Additionally, Mazure's research places special emphasis on the effects of stress and the role of sex and gender.

Professional service 
She is the Scientific Director of Yale’s Specialized Center of Research  — funded by the National Institutes of Health — which develops gender-sensitive treatments for tobacco dependence and a consultant to the Yale Tobacco Center of Regulatory Science.

Mazure served on the planning committee for the First White House Conference on Mental Health, was a fellow for the United States House Committee on Oversight and Government Reform, chaired the American Psychological Association’s Summit on Women and Depression, and has provided testimony to the United States Senate and House of Representatives on the importance of women’s health research. Recently, she was asked to join the Advisory Committee for the NIH Office for Research on Women’s Health.

Honors and recognition 
She has been an invited speaker at diverse venues ranging from NASA and the Smithsonian Institution to the International Psychogeriatric Association Meetings in Stockholm, Sweden. She has been a featured expert on ABC’s Prime Time Live and in the BBC documentary The Science of Stress. Her books include Does Stress Cause Psychiatric Illness? andUnderstanding Depression in Women: Applying Empirical Research to Practice and Policy. Mazure is the recipient of the Stephen Fleck Clinician and Teacher Award from Yale, and her national awards include the Marion Spencer Fay Award from the Institute for Women’s Health and Leadership, the American Psychological Association Distinguished Leadership Award from the Committee on Women in Psychology, and a United States Public Health Fellowship.

 Elected to the Connecticut Academy of Science and Engineering in 2010.
 Inducted to the Connecticut Women's Hall of Fame in 2009
 Received the American Psychological Association Distinguished Leadership Award
 Served on the Committee on Women in Psychology in 2008
 Received the Elizabeth Blackwell Award from the National Organization for Women — Connecticut Chapter in 2007
 Received the Marion Spencer Fay Award from Institute for Women's Health and Leadership in 2007
 Received the Stephen Fleck Clinician and Teacher Faculty Award from the Department of Psychiatry, Yale School of Medicine in 1994
 Served as United States Public Health Service Fellow in 1979

Selected publications 
 Weinberger AH, Mazure CM, Morlett A, McKee SA. Two decades of smoking cessation treatment research on smokers with depression: 1990–2010. Nicotine & Tobacco Research, 15(6):1014-1031, 2013.
 Smith MV, Ramsay C, Mazure CM. Understanding disparities in subpopulations of women who smoke. Current Addiction Reports, 1; 1(1):69-74, 2014.
 Weinberger AH, Pilver CE, Mazure CM, McKee SA. Stability of smoking status in the US population: a longitudinal investigation. Addiction, 109(9):1541-1553, 2014.
 Smith PH, Rose JS, Mazure CM, Giovino GA, McKee SA. What is the evidence for hardening in the cigarette smoking population? Trends in nicotine dependence in the U.S., 2002–2012. Drug and Alcohol Dependence, 1; 142:333-340, 2014.
 Mazure CM, Weinberger AH, Pittman B, Sibon I, Swendsen J. Gender and stress in predicting depressive symptoms following stroke. Cerebrovascular Disorders, 38(4):240-246, 2014.

See also
List of female scientists in the 21st century
Medical research
Public Health

References

1949 births
Living people
21st-century American women
American psychiatrists
21st-century American psychologists
American women academics
American women psychiatrists
American women psychologists
Psychiatry academics
Psychology educators
Yale School of Medicine faculty
Yale University faculty
20th-century American psychologists